A Barefoot Dream is a 2010 drama film co-production between South Korea and Japan directed by Kim Tae-kyun. It is based on the true story of Kim Shin-hwan, a retired Korean footballer who goes to East Timor after his business fails and launches a youth football team, thus becoming the "Hiddink of Korea." The film was selected as the South Korean entry for the Best Foreign Language Film at the 83rd Academy Awards but it did not make the final shortlist. The film recorded 332,699 admissions during its theatrical run in South Korea.

Plot
Kim Won-kang (Park Hee-soon) is a former football prospect whose life did not turn out quite as he had hoped. He heads to East Timor, where he thinks there will be plenty of opportunities for him. One day, he sees a group of street kids playing football with bare feet. Thinking he can score by selling football shoes, he opens a sports equipment store, but realizes none of the kids can afford those fancy shoes or jerseys. Again, despaired, he is about to close up the store. Then, he decides to teach the kids how to play football. Penniless and still without shoes, they decide to compete at the International Youth Football Championship in Japan.

Cast
 Park Hee-soon as Coach Kim Won-kang
 Ko Chang-seok as Park In-gi
 Francisco Varela as Ramos
 Fernando Pinto as Motavio
 Junior Da Costa as Tua
 Marlina Simoes as Josephine
 Kei Shimizu as Dozyo
 Im Won-hee as Director Poong
 Kim Seo-hyung as Reporter Yu Bo-hyeon
 Shin Cheol-jin as Shin Young-hoon	
 Cho Jin-woong as James

See also
 List of submissions to the 83rd Academy Awards for Best Foreign Language Film
 List of South Korean submissions for the Academy Award for Best Foreign Language Film

References

External links

2010 films
2010 drama films
2010s sports drama films
Films directed by Kim Tae-kyun
South Korean sports drama films
Association football films
2010s Korean-language films
Showbox films
East Timor–South Korea relations
Films set in East Timor
2010s South Korean films